Orc is a concurrent, nondeterministic computer programming language created by Jayadev Misra at the University of Texas at Austin.

Orc provides uniform access to computational services, including distributed communication and data manipulation, through sites. Using four simple concurrency primitives, the programmer orchestrates the invocation of sites to achieve a goal, while managing timeouts, priorities, and failures.

External links

Bibliography 
 
 
 
 
 
 
 
 
 

Concurrent programming languages